WDBG (103.1 FM) is a radio station licensed to serve the community of Dexter, Georgia. The station is owned by radioJones, LLC, and airs a classic hits format.

The station was assigned the WDBG call letters by the Federal Communications Commission on July 4, 2011.

References

External links
 Official Website
 

DBG
Radio stations established in 2013
2013 establishments in Georgia (U.S. state)
Classic hits radio stations in the United States
Laurens County, Georgia